The Pinacoteca Civica di Palazzo Volpi is the town art gallery on Via Diaz 84 in the town of Como, Lombardy, Italy. It is housed in the 17th-century Palazzo Volpi.

History
The palace was erected from 1610 to 1630 by the Catholic nuncio and bishop of Novara, Ulpiano Volpi. He commissioned the sober Renaissance-style design from the architect Sergio Venturi. The building in the 20th century served as a courthouse until the 1970s.

Presently it is a civic art gallery. It houses collections whose core pre-19th-century works come from suppressed ecclesiastic institutions. For example, it houses Carolingian sculptures from the church of Sant'Abbondio as well as Romanesque and Gothic sculptures and frescoes. It contains a display of Paolo Giovio's portraits of illustrious men. It houses items from the Como Cathedral, including stained glass windows, sculptures, tapestries and wooden models. Among the paintings are:
Virgin (Virgo advocata) attributed to Jacomart and Pere Joan Reixach
Country Concert painted on 16th-century table by Ambrosius Benson
Birth of the Virgin tapestry from the Como Cathedral
Illuminated Libro d'Ore from Milan
Nativity, panel by Giovanni Andrea de Magistris, father of Simone de Magistris
Madonna with Child among Saints Cosma and Damiano (1515) fresco by the Master of the SS. Cosma and Damiano
Fall of the Rebel Angels by Pier Francesco Mazzucchelli named "Morazzone", lunette from chapel in San Giovanni Pedemonte
Triumph of the Archangel Michael by Carlo Francesco Nuvolone, lunette from chapel in San Giovanni Pedemonte
Miracle of the Eucharist (1629) by Cristoforo Caresana, canvas from the chapel of San Pietro Martire of San Giovanni Pedemonte
St Peter healing a Young Man (1629) by Giovanni Paolo Ghianda, canvas from the chapel of San Pietro Martire of San Giovanni Pedemonte
Madonna Assunta with Saints Roch, Catherine, and Agnes by a young Giulio Cesare Procaccini
St Helena and the True Cross, Birth of John the Baptist, and Event of Sinite Parvulos, canvases from the Palazzo Olginati
Works by Giovanni Pietro Gnocchi
Portrait of Vespasiano Gonzaga Colonna (1559) portrait of the prince of Sabbioneta in arms of a Habsburg official parade by Bernardino Campi
Guardian Angel by Pietro Ligari 
Works in the style of Futurism by Antonio Sant'Elia
Abstract art by Como Group
Works by Ico Parisi

References

Palaces in Lombardy
Renaissance architecture in Lombardy
Museums in Lombardy
Art museums and galleries in Lombardy